MAXX was a public transport brand in the  Auckland Region of New Zealand. It was introduced in 2001. It included a blue livery used on some buses (rapid transit only) and trains operated for Auckland Transport (AT). It was also used for public information and advertising branding.

In July 2012, Auckland Transport (which replaced Auckland Regional Transport Authority in 2010) announced that it would phase out the brand, which was "weak and irrelevant" and had not achieved much public recognition, in favour of the AT Metro brand.

Naming and criticism
At launch, Auckland Regional Transport Authority deemphasised the question of whether or not the name was an acronym:

 "MAXX does stand for something. MAXX stands for comfortable and attractive facilities for commuters; fast, frequent and more reliable transport services; and comprehensive transport information. MAXX is not another acronym, but a symbol of quality."

The brand was originally intended to refer to Metropolitan Auckland XXpressways, a brand developed by Auckland-based Sanders Design / Stephenson & Turner. It featured a dark blue livery and a 'pesky cartoon pūkeko called Maxx'. As described by Brian Rudman, the intention to brand the whole of Auckland's public transport fleet - arrived at after years of negotiation - was undermined by the insistence of operators like Stagecoach / Infratil to use their own livery, relegating the brand to an afterthought displayed much less prominently.

Usage 
Apart from some usage on trains and ferries, most buses in Auckland operated in their operators' livery and brand with small MAXX stickers near the front entrance, but Northern Express buses on the Northern Busway used the MAXX brand more prominently.

See also
 Public transport in Auckland
 AT Metro
 List of NZ railfan jargon

References 

Rail transport in Auckland
Public transport in Auckland